Manana may refer to:

Places
Mānana or Mānana Island, an islet in Hawaii
Manana Island (Maine), an island off Maine, United States, adjacent to Monhegan island

People

Given name
Manana Anasashvili (born 1952), Georgian film and theatre director, and academic
Manana Antadze (born 1945), Georgian writer and translator
Manana Archvadze-Gamsakhurdia, Georgian pediatrician, activist and politician
Manana Catherine Mabuza, South African politician, acting Premier of Limpopo
Manana Chitishvili (born 1954), Georgian poet and academic
Manana Doijashvili, Georgian pianist and professor of piano
Manana Japaridze, Azerbaijani singer
Manana Kochladze (born c. 1972), Georgian biologist and environmentalist
Manana Matiashvili (born 1978), Georgian poet, translator, and academic
Manana Orbeliani (1808–1870), Georgian princess, noblewoman and socialite
Manana Shapakidze (born 1989), Georgian tennis player

Surname
Bernard Manana (born 1972), Papua New Guinean sprinter
Mduduzi Manana, South African politician
Thando Manana (born 1977), South African rugby union player

Other
 Manana (reflection), an essential Hindu ritual
 Manana Take, a goddess in the Rapa Nui mythology

See also
 Manama, the capital of Bahrain
 Mañana (disambiguation)

Georgian feminine given names